Hydrotrupes is a genus of beetles in the family Dytiscidae, containing the following species:

 Hydrotrupes chinensis Nilsson, 2003
 Hydrotrupes palpalis Sharp, 1882
 ✝Hydrotrupes prometheus R.A. Gómez & A.L. Damgaard, 2013

References

Dytiscidae